Astrothelium macrostomoides is a species of corticolous (bark-dwelling), crustose lichen in the family Trypetheliaceae. Found in Brazil, it was formally described as a new species in 2016 by Robert Lücking, Matthew Nelsen, Michel Navarro Benatti. The pseudostromata contain lichexanthone, which is a lichen product that causes these structures to fluoresce yellow when lit with a long-wavelength UV light. The species epithet macrostomoides alludes to the similarity of the lichen with Astrothelium macrostomum, from which it differs by having larger ascospores. The characteristics of the lichen that distinguish it from others in genus Astrothelium are the diffusely pseudostromatic ascomata with  pseudostromata, covered by thallus, each with a single group of fused ascomata; and the dimensions and form of the ascospores, which measure 80–110 by 17–25 μm, and have from five to seven septa.

References

macrostomoides
Lichen species
Lichens described in 2016
Taxa named by Robert Lücking
Lichens of Brazil